The Ambassador Extraordinary and Plenipotentiary of Ukraine to Mexico is the ambassador of Ukraine to Mexico. The current ambassador is Ruslan Spirin. He assumed the position in 2012. 

The first Ukrainian ambassador to Mexico assumed his post in 1999, the same year a Ukrainian embassy opened in Mexico City. Before 1999 the position was concurrently with the position of Ambassador Extraordinary and Plenipotentiary of Ukraine to the United States.

List of ambassadors

Ukraine
 2004–2006 Oleksandr Taranenko
 2006–2007 Ruslan Spirin
 2007–2012 Oleksiy Branashko
 Since 2012 Ruslan Spirin

External links 
  Embassy of Ukraine to Mexico: Previous Ambassadors

 
Mexico
Ukraine